Belemnia is a genus of moths in the subfamily Arctiinae. The genus was erected by Francis Walker in 1854. Species are found in Central and South America.

Species 
 Belemnia alpha Druce, 1884 (Metriophyla alpha)
 Belemnia aplaga Hampson, 1901
 Belemnia dubia Kirby 1902
 Belemnia eryx Fabricius, 1775 (Zygaena eryx) 
 Belemnia inaurata Sulzer, 1776 (Sphinx inaurata)
 Belemnia jovis Butler 1875
 Belemnia lydia Druce, 1896 
 Belemnia mygdon Druce, 1900
 Belemnia ochriplaga Hampson, 1901
 Belemnia pavonia Forbes 1939
 Belemnia trotschi (Druce, 1884)

References

External links

Arctiini
Moth genera